Thaban'a Mahlanya is a community council located in the Thaba-Tseka District of Lesotho. Its population in 2006 was 14,416.

Villages
The community of Thaban'a Mahlanya includes the villages of Ha Laka, Ha Majara, Ha Moeko, Ha Moqekela, Ha Motsepa, Ha Motsoloane, Ha Mphafi, Ha Mpora, Ha Phaila, Ha Ramalapi, Ha Rantsimana, Ha Rasebate, Ha Sephooko, Hillside, Khomo-ea-Leburu, Lingoareng, Liphokoaneng, Majakaneng, Majakaneng, Maqethong, Mohlakeng, Patisi, Phomolong, Pontšeng, Projecteng, Sekiring, Thabana Mahlanya, Thabong, Thabong II and Topa.

References

External links
 Google map of community villages

Populated places in Thaba-Tseka District
Thaba-Tseka District